Cheltenham is a suburb of Adelaide, South Australia. It is located on Kaurna Land in the City of Charles Sturt.

Geography
The suburb lies between Port Road and Cheltenham Parade, which form its southwest and eastern boundaries respectively. The suburb is split in two by the Outer Harbor railway line.

History
Cheltenham Post Office opened on 8 February 1897 and closed in 1910.

In 1923,  Holden Motor Body Builders established a  site known as the Holden Woodville Plant in Cheltenham.

The plant attracted a lot of people to live in the area and especially in the adjacent suburb of Woodville through the 20th century. However,  Holden progressively moved its operations to its Elizabeth plant through the 1980s, leading to the closure of Holden Woodville Plant.

Demographics

The 2021 Census by the Australian Bureau of Statistics counted 2,236 persons in Cheltenham on census night. Of these, 48.1% were male and 50.9% were female.

The majority of residents (71.5%) are of Australian birth, with other common census responses being England (5.3%) and India (2.5%).

The age distribution of Cheltenham residents is similar to that of the greater Australian population. 71.3% of residents were over 25 years in 2006, compared to the Australian average of 69.9%; and 28.7% were younger than 25 years, compared to the Australian average of 30.1%.

Politics

Local government
Cheltenham is part of Woodville Ward in the City of Charles Sturt local government area, being represented in that council by Oanh Nguyen and Robert Grant.

State and federal
Cheltenham lies in the state electoral district of Cheltenham and the federal electoral division of Port Adelaide. The suburb is represented in the South Australian House of Assembly by Joe Szakacs and federally by Mark Butler.

Facilities and attractions

Cheltenham Cemetery
Cheltenham Cemetery, located between Port Road and Cheltenham Parade, was established in 1876.

Transportation

Roads
Cheltenham is serviced by Port Road, connecting the suburb to Port Adelaide and Adelaide city centre, and by Cheltenham Parade.

Public transport
Cheltenham is serviced by public transport run by the Adelaide Metro.

Rail
The Outer Harbor train service passes through the suburb. The closest stations are Cheltenham and Cheltenham Racecourse. (now closed).

Trams previously ran through Cheltenham, but the lines were removed.

Buses
The suburb is serviced by bus routes run by the Adelaide Metro.

See also

 List of Adelaide suburbs

References

External links

Suburbs of Adelaide
Populated places established in 1849
1849 establishments in Australia